Vilangu is a 2022 Indian Tamil-language crime thriller streaming television series produced as an Original for Zee5, directed by Prasanth Pandiyaraj of Bruce Lee fame. Produced by Escape Artists the series stars Vemal in the lead role along with Ineya, Bala Saravanan, Munishkanth and R. N. R. Manohar. The series comprised seven episodes and was released on Zee5 on 18 February 2022.

Synopsis
IllamParidhi (Vemal), a sub-inspector at the Vembur Police Station, in the outskirts of Trichy, is unable to balance his personal and professional life and it is the latter that consumes most of his time. A jewellery theft in a house, a decomposed dead body without a head, a cold-blooded murder - all three crimes that happen back to back, fall under the Vembur Police jurisdiction and the crimes are being investigated by Paridhi and his team of Police officers including Karuppu (Bala Saravanan), Uthaman (Munishkanth), and others. As they set out to find the killer, they are welcomed by a series of unexpected events. Who is responsible for the murders that happened in the village and what was the final outcome of the police investigation?

Cast
 Vemal as Ilamparithi 
 Ineya as Revathi
 Bala Saravanan as Karuppu
 Munishkanth as SI Uthaman
 R. N. R. Manohar as Inspector Kodilingam
 S. S. Chakravarthy as DSP Vaidhyanathan
 Reshma Pasupuleti as Selvi
 Ravi as Kitchaan
 Sai Umesh
 Yogi

Reception
The series opened to extreme positive reviews. Vignesh Madhu of Cinema Express rated the series with 3/5 stars, stating that, "The word Vilangu is an apt title for a series which is about cops as well as a deceitful man, who hides a beast in him. Leaving aside the horrifying violence, the convenient plot points, and the insipid 'family' scenes, Vilangu makes for a compelling watch." Behindwoods gave a rating of 3 out on 5 and wrote, "Strong performances from Vemal and Bala Saravanan, Ajesh's music and Prasanth's clever writing together propel Vilangu to a must watch zone." The News Minute wrote, "Vilangu makes for a gripping watch because it downplays its surprises intelligently, and doesn’t fall back on flashy, unrealistic reveals that revolve around a hero cop (the background score, too, is committed to the plot and not Paruthi). It’s a cat and mouse game where we aren’t sure until the end who is the cat and who is the mouse. Well played." OTTplay.com rated the series with 3.5/5 stars, called the series an edge-of-the-seat thriller. Binged.com gave a rating of 6.25 out on 10 and wrote the film as Slow Paced But Engaging Police Procedural Thriller. Galatta said "Vilangu is truly a comeback of sorts for Vemal and director Prasanth Pandiyaraj!" and rated the series 3/5 stars.

Episodes

References

External links 
 

Tamil-language web series
2022 Tamil-language television series debuts
Tamil-language crime television series
Tamil-language thriller television series
ZEE5 original programming
2022 Tamil-language television series endings